HIMEM.SYS is a DOS device driver which allows DOS programs to store data in extended memory according to the Extended Memory Specification (XMS). The memory beyond the first 1 MB of address space is required by Windows 9x/Me in order to load; therefore, these versions of Microsoft Windows require HIMEM.SYS to be loaded to be able to run.

HIMEM.SYS was first included with Windows 2.1 (1988).

In MS-DOS 5.0 (1991) and later, HIMEM.SYS can be used to load the DOS kernel code into the High Memory Area (HMA) to increase the amount of available conventional memory by specifying DOS=HIGH in CONFIG.SYS.

In DR DOS 5.0 (1990) and 6.0 (1991), the driver is named HIDOS.SYS rather than HIMEM.SYS, like the corresponding DCONFIG.SYS or CONFIG.SYS directive HIDOS=ON.

In FreeDOS, the matching file is named HIMEM.EXE and can be loaded from the FreeDOS configuration file named FDCONFIG.SYS or CONFIG.SYS.

In Windows 3.1 and Windows 9x, there is also a command-line loadable version of HIMEM.SYS called XMSMMGR.EXE. It can load extended memory services after the system boots into the command prompt. This allows Windows Setup to load even if HIMEM.SYS is not loaded.

History
The major version number of HIMEM.SYS indicates the Extended Memory Specification (XMS) version compatibility. e.g., HIMEM.SYS 3.07 is compatible with XMS version 3.0.

See also
 Conventional memory
 Extended memory
 High memory area
 Upper memory area
 EMM386
 Memory management
 LOADALL

References

DOS files
DOS drivers
DOS memory management
Windows files